Henk Van der Kolk is a Canadian film producer, best known as a cofounder of the Toronto International Film Festival and the Academy of Canadian Cinema and Television.

Originally from Zwolle, Netherlands,  Van der Kolk emigrated to Canada in 1959. His credits as a film producer include Outrageous! (1977), Wild Horse Hank (1979), Mr. Patman (1980), Hank Williams: The Show He Never Gave (1980) and Circle of Two (1981). Most of the films were coproduced with Bill Marshall through their firm Film Consortium of Canada.

More recently, Van der Kolk was a founder of a new film festival in Panama. He and his wife Yanka are currently partners in Imaging & Photography, a professional portrait photography studio.

References

External links

Film producers from Ontario
Film festival founders
Dutch emigrants to Canada
Toronto International Film Festival people
Living people
Academy of Canadian Cinema & Television people
People from Zwolle
Year of birth missing (living people)